Garry Cobain (sometimes styled as Gaz Cobain) (born 16 May 1967) is a British electronic musician, and one half of the Future Sound of London.

Background
Cobain was born on 16 May 1967 in Bedford. He left Bedford for Manchester in his late teens to study at a time when alternative music in that part of Britain was taking off; the dance music scene in particular was becoming more and more popular, not just in Manchester but all over the country and in the States too. Cobain, drawn to the city by bands like The Chameleons and The Smiths, embraced this atmosphere and joined a band he had seen rehearsing in a studio and stayed with them for a year; after his spell with that band he met Brian Dougans.

Music
After meeting Dougans they both started discussing their shared interest in electronic music and began to work together on small projects; Cobain then left the college to build his own studio on an Enterprise Allowance Course and he and Dougans began to release tracks under aliases such as Mental Cube and Art Science Technology, some of these early singles would be compiled onto Earthbeat (1992).

His first big collaboration with Dougans was on "Stakker Humanoid", which went on to be a chart hit at a time when acid house in particular was becoming popular. The pair then released their first single as The Future Sound of London (FSOL) "Papua New Guinea" which also became a hit in clubs across Britain and the States. They signed with Virgin Records but remained independent artistically, something they have always fought for and achieved; Cobain puts this down to them already having a few hits under their belts ("Papua New Guinea" in particular) before they signed with the major label.

Cobain has always been the more vocal member of the band and always speaks for them in interviews with Dougans sometimes interjecting on a certain point; Cobain has said that FSOL is a combination of opposites, the roles of masculine and feminine are central to the FSOL ethos and Cobain has said that in the band he represents the melody and softness as opposed to Dougans representing technology, machines and programming; it is the marriage of these forces, Cobain says, that makes FSOL work the way it does, especially with the Amorphous Androgynous of the new millennium where progressive rock and psychedelica were embraced. The new incarnation of Amorphous Androgynous is very much Cobain's new vehicle for the expression of his energy whilst still releasing their more electronic-based music as FSOL.

He has stated that he is influenced philosophically by Laozi, Buddha and Jiddu Krishnamurti and that he likes the bands Secret Chiefs 3, Mercury Rev and Simian among many others.

References

External links
 
An in-depth interview with him from 2006

1967 births
Living people
People from Bedford
English dance musicians
English electronic musicians
English new-age musicians
English experimental musicians
English record producers
Intelligent dance musicians
Remixers
Breakbeat musicians